Michael L. Nardulli (October 31, 1920 – April 14, 2007) was an American politician.

Born in Chicago, Illinois, Nardulli went to Wells High School. He served in the United States Army during World War II. Nardulli was involved with the Democratic Party. Nardulli served in the Illinois House of Representatives from 1975 to 1979. He then served on the Chicago City Council from 1979 to 1986. Mardulli served on the Illinois Pollution Control Board from 1987 to 1994. Nardulli died at his home in Chicago, Illinois.

Notes

1920 births
2007 deaths
Politicians from Chicago
Military personnel from Illinois
Chicago City Council members
Democratic Party members of the Illinois House of Representatives
20th-century American politicians